St. Leo may refer to one of several saints named Leo, or:

Places

Australia
 St Leo's Catholic College, Sydney
 St Leo's College, University of Queensland, Brisbane

Canada
 Saint Leo's Elementary School (Brantford), Ontario
 St. Leo's Roman Catholic Church, Mimico

Ireland
 St Leo's College, Carlow

United States
 St. Leo, Florida
 Saint Leo Abbey
 St. Leo, Kansas
 St. Leo, Minnesota
 Saint Leo, West Virginia

Schools
 Saint Leo University, St Leo, Florida
 St. Leo the Great School, Oakland, California
 St. Leo the Great School, San Jose, California
 St.Leo's Parish School, Elmwood Park, New Jersey
 St. Leo Catholic School, Winston-Salem, North Carolina
 St. Leo Primary School, KwaZulu-Natal Province, South Africa

Churches named St. Leo
 Saint Leo the Great Parish, within the Roman Catholic Diocese of San Jose, California
 St.Leo's Roman Catholic Church, Elmwood Park, New Jersey
 Chapel of St Leo, Żurrieq, Malta

Other
 St. Leo's (soccer team), an early twentieth century American soccer team